Isleworth & Syon School (formerly Isleworth Grammar School) is a non-denomination secondary school and sixth form for boys aged 11 to 18 years old. Girls are admitted to the school's sixth form, which is part of a consortium with other secondary schools in the borough. The school is situated on Ridgeway Road, Isleworth, within the London Borough of Hounslow, England. It is close to the A4, just south of Osterley Park. It has many travel links including Isleworth railway station, Osterley tube station and London Buses

History
Isleworth & Syon School can trace its history to the establishment of a charity school in 1630, making it one of the oldest schools in the area. During the 18th century it became known as The Blue School. Due to expansion it became a boys' school and the girls were moved out to a separate building in North Street in 1870. An upper school was added in 1883 to educate older boys. It was used as a "model school" for trainee teachers from Borough Road College, a teacher training school which merged with other similar colleges to form Brunel University's education faculty. It became a state school in 1903 when Middlesex County Council assumed control and renamed Isleworth County School several years later.

The North Street Girls' School was the female counterpart to the original Blue School. A separate infant school was founded near the girls' school and many children continued their education at the boys' school. It only came under the Blue Schools Foundation in the early 20th century. During the interwar period the girls' school became a coeducational junior school, later merging with the infant school. This school is still operating to this day under the original name "The Blue School".

In 1930/1931, the boys' school named Isleworth County School moved to Ridgeway Road where it has been ever since. Under the Education Act 1944 it became a grammar school. During the 1950s and 60's 'IGS' gained a particularly high academic reputation under the paternalistic if firm leadership of headmasters A. Brierley then G.J.P. 'Toad' Courtney. When Hounslow Council adopted the comprehensive system, it merged with Syon School for Boys in 1979 to form the current school and appropriately renamed Isleworth & Syon School.

Academics
In 2003, the school gained sports college status. On 1 March 2012, the school gained academy status.

The school forms a consortium with  other secondary schools in the borough. Consortium schools have a common academic timetable, allowing sixth form students to interact and exchange lessons.

In 2005, the school was named sports college of the year in the UK under the guidance of former olympian Jason Wing.

Notable former pupils 
 Mo Farah - Olympic 10,000m and 5000m champion 
 Owais Shah - England cricketer
 Gautam Malkani - author and journalist
 Chris Plummer - former professional footballer for Queens Park Rangers
 Michael Bryan - former professional footballer for Watford
 Reece James - Chelsea footballer 
 Prince Patel - professional boxer

Isleworth Grammar School 
 Sir Roger Carrick – ambassador to Indonesia 1990–1994, high commissioner to Australia 1994–1997
 Tom Newman (musician) - co-founder of Virgin Records, producer of Mike Oldfield's 'Tubular Bells', composer, guitarist (1954–1956)
 Frederick William Hedges, British Army lieutenant and recipient of the Victoria Cross during the First World War (Isleworth County School)
 Geoffrey Lilley – professor of aeronautics and astronautics at the University of Southampton from 1964 to 1982
 Richard Shepherd – Conservative MP for Aldridge-Brownhills from 1979 to 2015
 Alan Whitehead – Labour MP for Southampton Test since 1997
 Mark Woodnutt – Conservative MP for the Isle of Wight from 1959 to 1974

References

External links 
 Ofsted reports
 Foxtons School information
 EduBase
 Old Isleworthians Rugby Club

Boys' schools in London
Academies in the London Borough of Hounslow
Secondary schools in the London Borough of Hounslow
Isleworth